Ernest Augustus, Crown Prince of Hanover, 3rd Duke of Cumberland and Teviotdale (21 September 1845 – 14 November 1923), was the eldest child and only son of George V of Hanover and his wife, Marie of Saxe-Altenburg. Ernest Augustus was deprived of the thrones of Hanover upon its annexation by Prussia in 1866 and later the Duchy of Brunswick in 1884. Although he was the most senior male-line descendant of George I, II, and III, the Duke of Cumberland was deprived of his British peerages and honours for having sided with Germany in World War I.

Early life

Prince Ernest Augustus of Hanover, Duke of Brunswick-Lüneburg, Prince of Great Britain and Ireland, was born at Hanover during the reign of his paternal grandfather, Ernest Augustus, King of Hanover. He became the crown prince of Hanover upon his father's accession as George V in November 1851. William I of Prussia and his minister-president Otto von Bismarck deposed George V and annexed Hanover after George sided with the defeated Austria in the 1866 Austro-Prussian War. During that war, the Crown Prince saw action at the Battle of Langensalza.

Exile
After the war, the exiled Hanoverian royal family took up residence in Hietzing, near Vienna, but spent a good deal of time in Paris. George V never abandoned his claim to the Hanoverian throne and maintained the Guelphic Legion at his own expense. The former Crown Prince travelled during this early period of exile, and ultimately accepted a commission in the Imperial and Royal Army of Austria-Hungary. The Guelph Party, or the German-Hanoverian Party, as a minor party in the legislature of the North German Federation and then the German Empire continued to protest the annexation of Hanover and advocated for the restoration of the state of Hanover with a Guelph at its head.

Succession
When King George V died in Paris on 12 June 1878, Prince Ernest Augustus succeeded him as Duke of Cumberland and Teviotdale in the Peerage of Great Britain and Earl of Armagh in the Peerage of Ireland. Queen Victoria created him a Knight of the Garter on 1 August 1878. Emperor Franz Joseph I of Austria appointed him to succeed his father as colonel and proprietor of the Austrian 42nd Regiment of Infantry. The regiment's name was changed to honour him, and he served as its honorary colonel from 1879 to the fall of the Austro-Hungarian Empire, in 1918.

Marriage
While visiting his second cousin Albert Edward, Prince of Wales (later King Edward VII) at Sandringham in 1875, he met Princess Thyra of Denmark (29 September 1853 – 26 February 1933), the youngest daughter of King Christian IX and a sister of the Princess of Wales (later Queen Alexandra).

On 21/22 December 1878, he and Princess Thyra married at Christiansborg Palace in Copenhagen.

Duchy of Brunswick
Queen Victoria appointed the Duke of Cumberland a colonel in the British Army in 1876 and promoted him to major general in 1886, lieutenant general in 1892 and general in 1898. Although he was a British peer and a prince of Great Britain and Ireland, he continued to consider himself an exiled monarch of a German realm and refused to disclaim his succession rights to Hanover, making his home in Gmunden, Upper Austria.

The Duke of Cumberland was also first in the line of succession to the Duchy of Brunswick after his distant cousin, Duke William. In 1879, when it became apparent that the senior line of the House of Welf would die with William, the Brunswick parliament created a council of regency to take over administration of the duchy upon William's death.  This council would appoint a regent if the Duke of Cumberland could not ascend the throne.  When William died in 1884, the Duke of Cumberland proclaimed himself Duke of Brunswick. However, since he still claimed to be the legitimate King of Hanover as well, the German Bundesrat declared that he would disturb the peace of the empire if he ascended the ducal throne.  Under Prussian pressure, the council of regency ignored his claim and appointed Prince Albert of Prussia as regent.

Negotiations between Ernest Augustus and the German government continued for almost three decades, to no avail.  During this time, Regent Albert died and Duke John Albert of Mecklenburg was appointed as regent.

Reconciliation
The Duke of Cumberland was partially reconciled with the Hohenzollern dynasty in 1913, when his surviving son, Prince Ernest Augustus, married the only daughter of Kaiser Wilhelm II, the grandson of the Prussian king who had deposed his father. On 24 October 1913, he renounced his succession rights to the Brunswick duchy (which had belonged to the Guelph dynasty since 1235) in favour of his son. The younger Ernest Augustus thus became the reigning Duke of Brunswick on 1 November 1913 and married the Kaiser's daughter. As a mark of regard for his daughter's father-in-law, Kaiser Wilhelm II created the elder Ernest Augustus a Knight of the Order of the Black Eagle.

In 1918, the younger Duke Ernest Augustus abdicated his throne along with the other German princes when all the German dynasties were disestablished by the successor German provisional Government which was established when the Emperor himself abdicated and fled Germany in exile to the Netherlands.

War

The outbreak of World War I created a breach between the British Royal Family and its Hanoverian cousins. On 13 May 1915, King George V of the United Kingdom ordered the removal of the Duke of Cumberland from the Roll of the Order of the Garter. According to the letters patent on 30 November 1917, he lost the status of a British prince and the style of Highness. Under the terms of the Titles Deprivation Act 1917, on 28 March 1919 his name was removed from the roll of Peers of Great Britain and of Ireland by Order of the King in Council for "bearing arms against Great Britain."

Later life
Prince Ernest Augustus, the former Crown Prince of Hanover and former Duke of Cumberland, died of a stroke on his estate at Gmunden in November 1923. He is interred, next to his wife and his mother, in a mausoleum which he had built adjacent to Cumberland Castle.

Honours and arms

Orders and decorations

Military Appointments
In Germany:
  1863 (ca.): Leutnant, Royal Hanoverian Garde-Husaren-Regiment
  9 December 1912 (ca.): Generalmajor à la Suite, Royal Bavarian Schweren Reiter-Regiment "Prinz Karl von Bayern" Nr. 1

In Austria:
  1879: Oberstinhaber (Colonel and Proprietor), K.u.K. Infanterieregiment "Ernst August, Herzog von Cumberland und Herzog zu Braunschweig-Lüneburg" Nr. 42
  1914 (ca.): Generalmajor, K.u.K. Armee
  1914-1918 (ca.): General der Kavallerie, K.u.K. Armee

In the United Kingdom:
  27 May 1876: Colonel, British Army
  19 March 1886: Major General, British Army
  1 April 1892: Lieutenant General, British Army
  14 December 1898: General, British Army

Arms

Until his father's death in 1878, Ernest Augustus's arms in right of the United Kingdom were those of his father (being the arms of the Kingdom of Hanover differenced by a label gules bearing a horse courant argent). Upon his father's death, he inherited his arms.

Issue

The Duke and Duchess of Cumberland and Teviotdale had six children:

Ancestry

Patrilineal descent, descent from father to son, is the principle behind membership in royal houses, as it can be traced back through the generations - which means that the historically accurate royal house of monarchs of the House of Hanover was the House of Lucca (or Este, or Welf).

This is the descent of the primary male heir. For the complete expanded family tree, see List of members of the House of Hanover.

Oberto I, 912 - 975
Oberto II, 940 - 1017
Albert Azzo I, Margrave of Milan, 970 - 1029
Albert Azzo II, Margrave of Milan, d. 1097
Welf I, Duke of Bavaria, 1037–1101
Henry IX, Duke of Bavaria, 1074–1126
Henry X, Duke of Bavaria, 1108–1139
Henry the Lion, 1129–1195
William of Winchester, Lord of Lunenburg, 1184–1213
Otto I, Duke of Brunswick-Lüneburg, 1204–1252
Albert I, Duke of Brunswick-Lüneburg, 1236–1279
Albert II, Duke of Brunswick-Lüneburg, 1268–1318
Magnus the Pious, Duke of Brunswick-Lüneburg, 1304–1369
Magnus II, Duke of Brunswick-Lüneburg, 1328–1373
Bernard I, Duke of Brunswick-Lüneburg, 1362–1434
Frederick II, Duke of Brunswick-Lüneburg, 1408–1478
Otto V, Duke of Brunswick-Lüneburg, 1439–1471
Henry I, Duke of Brunswick-Lüneburg, 1468–1532
Ernest I, Duke of Brunswick-Lüneburg, 1497–1546
William, Duke of Brunswick-Lüneburg, 1535–1592
George, Duke of Brunswick-Lüneburg, 1582–1641
Ernest Augustus, Elector of Hanover, 1629–1698
George I of Great Britain, 1660–1727
George II of Great Britain, 1683–1760
Frederick, Prince of Wales, 1707–1751
George III of the United Kingdom, 1738–1820
Ernest Augustus, King of Hanover, 1771–1851
George V of Hanover, 1819–1878
Ernest Augustus, Crown Prince of Hanover, 1845–1923

Notes

External links

1845 births
1923 deaths
Princes of the United Kingdom
Hanoverian princes
House of Hanover
Sons of kings
Dukes of Cumberland and Teviotdale
Nobility from Hanover
People from the Kingdom of Hanover
Heirs apparent who never acceded
Crown Princes of Hanover
Austro-Hungarian generals
Burials at the Schloss Cumberland Mausoleum
Knights of the Garter
Recipients of the Cross of Honour of the Order of the Dannebrog
Knights of the Golden Fleece of Spain
Knights Cross of the Military Order of Maria Theresa
Grand Crosses of the Order of Saint Stephen of Hungary
Military personnel from Hanover
Austrian Empire military personnel of the Austro-Prussian War